George Ireland (1913–2001) was an American basketball coach.

George Ireland may also refer to:

George Ireland (businessman) (1801–1879), one of the founders of Ireland Fraser & Co. Ltd. of Mauritius
George Ireland (MP), Member of Parliament (MP) for Appleby and Great Bedwyn, UK
George Ireland (New Zealand politician) (1829–1880), Member of Parliament from the Southland Region of New Zealand